Fox is an unincorporated community in Kendall County, in the U.S. state of Illinois. It is located between the  Village of Millbrook and the  City of Yorkville.

The community was originally named Fox Station due to its relationship with the Chicago, Burlington, & Quincy Railroad. It served the local farming community by providing a school, grain elevator, feed mill, store and post office.

References

Unincorporated communities in Kendall County, Illinois
Unincorporated communities in Illinois